Xu Kunlin (born May 1965) is a Chinese politician who is the current governor of Jiangsu, in office since 19 October 2021. Previously he served as party secretary of a major city, of Suzhou, the largest city in Jiangsu.

Biography
Xu was born in Yongchun County, Fujian, in May 1965. In 1980, he enrolled in Hangzhou Institute of Commerce (now Zhejiang Gongshang University), majoring in planning statistics, where he graduated in 1984.

After university, in August 1984, he was despatched to State Administration of commodity Prices (now National Development and Reform Commission), where he worked successively as director of the Department of Price Supervision, director of the Department of Fixed Assets Investment, and deputy secretary-general.

In March 2017, he took office of vice mayor of Shanghai, one of the four direct-administered municipalities of China and one of China's economic centers.

In September 2020, he was transferred to the neighboring Jiangsu province and appointed party secretary of Suzhou, the top political position in the capital city. And he was admitted to member of the standing committee of the CPC Jiangsu Provincial Committee, the province's top authority. On 19 October 2021, he was promoted to acting governor of Jiangsu, replacing Wu Zhenglong.

References

 

1965 births
Living people
People from Yongchun County
Zhejiang Gongshang University alumni
People's Republic of China politicians from Jiangsu
Chinese Communist Party politicians from Jiangsu
Governors of Jiangsu